Samuel Barker (c. 1659 – 1 May 1708) was the member of Parliament for Cricklade in the parliaments of 1702 and 1705.

References 

1650s births
1708 deaths
Year of birth uncertain
17th-century English people
English MPs 1702–1705
English MPs 1705–1707
Members of the Parliament of England (pre-1707) for Cricklade
High Sheriffs of Gloucestershire
People from Fairford